Alon HaGalil (lit. Oak of the Galilee) is a community settlement in northern Israel. Located in the Lower Galilee, it falls under the jurisdiction of Jezreel Valley Regional Council.

Alon Hagalil was founded on the land of the depopulated Palestinian town of Saffuriya in 1980. Founded as a moshav, it converted to a community settlement in 1986, but remains a member of the Moshavim Movement.

Notable residents
Erel Halevi

References

External links
Village website 

Community settlements
Former moshavim
Populated places established in 1980
Populated places in Northern District (Israel)